Protasy is a rural locality (a settlement) in Kultayevskoye Rural Settlement, Permsky District, Perm Krai, Russia. The population was 240 as of 2010. There are 89 streets.

Geography 
Protasy is located 32 km southwest of Perm (the district's administrative centre) by road. Verkhniye Protasy is the nearest rural locality.

References 

Rural localities in Permsky District